Mollakent is a rural locality (a selo) and the administrative centre of Mollakentsky Selsoviet, Kurakhsky District, Republic of Dagestan, Russia. The population was 1,022 as of 2010. There are 25 streets.

Geography
Mollakent is located 158 km north of Kurakh (the district's administrative centre) by road. Madzhalis and Urkarakh are the nearest rural localities.

Nationalities 
Lezgins live there.

References 

Rural localities in Kurakhsky District